The Semelidae are a family of saltwater clams, marine bivalve molluscs in the order Cardiida.

Description
Members of this family have rounded or oval, elongated shells, much flattened. The two valves are connected by an internal ligament in contrast to the closely related family Tellinidae where the ligament is external. The two separate siphons are very long, sometimes several times the length of the shell. These siphons have a characteristic cruciform muscle at their base.

Selected genera
Genera of Semelidae (with some notable species also listed) include:
Abra Lamarck, 1818
Abra aequalis (Say, 1822)
Abra alba  (Wood W., 1802)  
Abra californica Kundsen, 1970
Abra lioica (Dall, 1881)
Abra longicallis Sacchi, 1836
Abra nitida (O. F. Mueller, 1776)
Abra pacifica Dall, 1915
Abra prismatica
Abra profundorum E. A. Smith, 1885
Abra tenuis (Montagu, 1818)
Abra tepocana Dall, 1915
Argyrodonax Dall, 1911
Cumingia G. B. Sowerby I, 1833
Cumingia californica Conrad, 1837
Cumingia coarctata G. B. Sowerby I, 1833
Cumingia tellinoides (Conrad, 1831)
Ervilia Turton, 1822
Ervilia bisculpta  Gould, 1861
Ervilia castanea  (Montagu, 1803)
Ervilia concentrica  (Holmes, 1860)
Ervilia nitens  (Montagu, 1808)
Ervilia producta  Odhner, 1922
Ervilia purpurea  (Smith, 1906)
Ervilia scaliola 
Iacra H. Adams & A. Adams, 1856
Leptomya A. Adams, 1864
Leptomya retiara aucklandica Powell
Leptomya retiara retiara (Hutton, 1885)
Leptomyaria Habe, 1960
Lonoa Dall, Bartsch & Rehder, 1938
Montrouzieria Souverbie, 1863
Rochefortina Dall, 1924
Scrobicularia Schumacher, 1815
Scrobicularia plana – Peppery furrow shell
Semele Schumacher, 1817
Semele bellastriata (Conrad, 1837)
Semele brambleyae (Powell, 1967)
Semele decisa (Conrad, 1837)
Semele incongrua Carpenter, 1864
Semele proficua (Pulteney, 1799)
Semele pulchra (G. B. Sowerby I, 1832)
Semele purpurascens (Gmelin, 1791)
Semele rubicola Dall, 1915
Semele rubropicta Dall, 1871
Semele rupicola Dall, 1915
Semele venusta (Reeve, 1853)
Semelina Dall, 1900
Semelina nuculoides (Conrad, 1841)
†Septeuilia Cossmann, 1913
Souleyetia Récluz, 1869
Theora H. Adams and A. Adams, 1856
Theora lubrica Gould, 1861
Theora mesopotamica Annandale 1918
Thyellisca H. E. Vokes, 1956

References

 Powell A. W. B., New Zealand Mollusca, William Collins Publishers Ltd, Auckland, New Zealand 1979 
http://gni.globalnames.org/data_sources/30?page=1&search_term=ns%3AERV*

 
Bivalve families
Taxa named by Ferdinand Stoliczka